In probability theory, the Rice distribution or Rician distribution (or, less commonly, Ricean distribution) is the probability distribution of the magnitude of a circularly-symmetric bivariate normal random variable, possibly with non-zero mean (noncentral). It was named after Stephen O. Rice (1907–1986).

Characterization
The probability density function is

where I0(z) is the modified Bessel function of the first kind with order zero.

In the context of Rician fading, the distribution is often also rewritten using the Shape Parameter , defined as the ratio of the power contributions by line-of-sight path to the remaining multipaths, and the Scale parameter , defined as the total power received in all paths.

The characteristic function of the Rice distribution is given as:

It is given by:

where

 

is the rising factorial.

Properties

Moments
The first few raw moments are:

and, in general, the raw moments are given by

Here Lq(x) denotes a Laguerre polynomial:

where  is the confluent hypergeometric function of the first kind. When k is even, the raw moments become simple polynomials in σ and ν, as in the examples above.

For the case q = 1/2:

The second central moment, the variance, is

Note that  indicates the square of the Laguerre polynomial , not the generalized Laguerre polynomial

Related distributions
Another case where  comes from the following steps:
  Generate  having a Poisson distribution with parameter (also mean, for a Poisson) 
  Generate  having a chi-squared distribution with  degrees of freedom.
  Set 
If  then  has a noncentral chi-squared distribution with two degrees of freedom and noncentrality parameter .
If  then  has a noncentral chi distribution with two degrees of freedom and noncentrality parameter .
If  then  has an exponential distribution.
If  then  has an Inverse Rician distribution.
 The folded normal distribution is the univariate special case of the Rice distribution.

Limiting cases
For large values of the argument, the Laguerre polynomial becomes

It is seen that as ν becomes large or σ becomes small the mean becomes ν and the variance becomes σ2.

The transition to a Gaussian approximation proceeds as follows.  From Bessel function theory we have

so, in the large  region, an asymptotic expansion of the Rician distribution:

 
The approximation becomes usable for

Parameter estimation (the Koay inversion technique)
There are three different methods for estimating the parameters of the Rice distribution, (1) method of moments,  (2) method of maximum likelihood, and (3) method of least squares. In the first two methods the interest is in estimating the parameters of the distribution, ν and σ, from a sample of data. This can be done using the method of moments, e.g., the sample mean and the sample standard deviation. The sample mean is an estimate of μ1' and the sample standard deviation is an estimate of μ21/2.

The following is an efficient method, known as the "Koay inversion technique". for solving the estimating equations, based on the sample mean and the sample standard deviation, simultaneously . This inversion technique is also known as the fixed point formula of SNR. Earlier works on the method of moments usually use a root-finding method to solve the problem, which is not efficient.

First, the ratio of the sample mean to the sample standard deviation is defined as r, i.e., . The fixed point formula of SNR is expressed as

This provides a starting point for the iteration, which uses functional composition, and this continues until  is less than some small positive value. Here,  denotes the composition of the same function,  times. In practice, we associate the final  for some integer  as the fixed point, i.e., .

and

To speed up the iteration even more, one can use the Newton's method of root-finding. This particular approach is highly efficient.

Applications
The Euclidean norm of a bivariate circularly-symmetric normally distributed random vector.
Rician fading (for multipath interference))
Effect of sighting error on target shooting.
Analysis of diversity receivers in radio communications.
Distribution of eccentricities for models of the inner Solar System after long-term numerical integration.

See also
Hoyt distribution
Rayleigh distribution

References

Further reading
Abramowitz, M. and Stegun, I. A.  (ed.), Handbook of Mathematical Functions, National Bureau of Standards, 1964; reprinted Dover Publications, 1965. 
Rice, S. O., Mathematical Analysis of Random Noise. Bell System Technical Journal 24 (1945) 46–156.

Liu, X. and Hanzo, L., A Unified Exact BER Performance Analysis of Asynchronous DS-CDMA Systems Using BPSK Modulation over Fading Channels, IEEE Transactions on Wireless Communications, Volume 6, Issue 10, October 2007, pp. 3504–3509.
Annamalai, A., Tellambura, C. and Bhargava, V. K., Equal-Gain Diversity Receiver Performance in Wireless Channels, IEEE Transactions on Communications,Volume 48, October 2000, pp. 1732–1745.
Erdelyi, A., Magnus, W., Oberhettinger, F. and Tricomi, F. G., Higher Transcendental Functions, Volume 1. McGraw-Hill Book Company Inc., 1953.
Srivastava, H. M. and Karlsson, P. W., Multiple Gaussian Hypergeometric Series. Ellis Horwood Ltd., 1985.
Sijbers J., den Dekker A. J., Scheunders P. and Van Dyck D., "Maximum Likelihood estimation of Rician distribution parameters", IEEE Transactions on Medical Imaging, Vol. 17, Nr. 3, pp. 357–361, (1998)
Varadarajan D. and Haldar J. P., "A Majorize-Minimize Framework for Rician and Non-Central Chi MR Images", IEEE Transactions on Medical Imaging, Vol. 34, no. 10, pp. 2191–2202, (2015)

 Koay, C.G. and Basser, P. J., Analytically exact correction scheme for signal extraction from noisy magnitude MR signals, Journal of Magnetic Resonance, Volume 179, Issue = 2, p. 317–322, (2006)
Abdi, A., Tepedelenlioglu, C., Kaveh, M., and Giannakis, G. On the estimation of the K parameter for the Rice fading distribution, IEEE Communications Letters, Volume 5, Number 3, March 2001, pp. 92–94.

External links
MATLAB code for Rice/Rician distribution (PDF, mean and variance, and generating random samples)

Continuous distributions

he:דעיכות מסוג רייס